New Year Blues is a 2021 South Korean romantic comedy film. The film stars Kim Kang-woo, Yoo In-na, Yoo Yeon-seok, Lee Yeon-hee, Lee Dong-hwi, Chen Duling, Yeom Hye-ran, Choi Soo-young and Teo Yoo.

Cast
 Kim Kang-woo as Kang Ji-hoo
 Yoo In-na as Hyo-young
 Yoo Yeon-seok as Jae-heon
 Lee Yeon-hee as Jin-ah
 Lee Dong-hwi as Yong-chan
 Chen Duling as Yao Lin
 Yeom Hye-ran as Yong-mi
 Choi Soo-young as Oh-wol
 Ye Soo-jung as Oh Hye-sim
 Teo Yoo as Rae-hwan

References

External links
 
 

2021 romantic comedy films
2020s Korean-language films
Chinese-language films
2020s Spanish-language films
2020s German-language films
South Korean romantic comedy films
South Korean Christmas films
Snowboarding films
Films about amputees
Films about the Paralympics
Films about divorce
Films about marriage
Films about fraud
Films set around New Year
Films set in South Korea
Films set in Seoul
Films set in Argentina
Films set in Buenos Aires
Films shot in South Korea
Films shot in Argentina
Films shot in Buenos Aires
Films postponed due to the COVID-19 pandemic
2021 multilingual films
South Korean multilingual films